Tyler Christianson (born 9 December 2001) is a Panamanian swimmer. He competed in the men's 200 metre breaststroke and in the men's 200 metre individual medley event at the 2020 Summer Olympics.

References

External links
 
 Notre Dame Fighting Irish bio

2001 births
Living people
Panamanian male swimmers
Olympic swimmers of Panama
Swimmers at the 2020 Summer Olympics
Place of birth missing (living people)
Pan American Games competitors for Panama
Swimmers at the 2019 Pan American Games
American people of Panamanian descent
Notre Dame Fighting Irish men's swimmers
21st-century Panamanian people